Ernst Franz Hermann Happel (29 November 1925 – 14 November 1992) was an Austrian football player and manager.

Happel is regarded as one of the greatest managers of all time, winning both league and domestic cup titles in the Netherlands, Belgium, West Germany, and Austria. Happel won the European Cup twice, in 1970 with Feyenoord and 1983 with Hamburger SV, managed Club Brugge to a European Cup runner-up finish in 1978, and won a runners-up medal with the Netherlands at the 1978 FIFA World Cup. This is the best result ever for a non-domestic manager in a World Cup alongside Englishman George Raynor's Swedish runner-up campaign in 1958. He was the first of the five managers to have won the European Cup with two clubs (Carlo Ancelotti, Ottmar Hitzfeld, José Mourinho, and Jupp Heynckes being the other four). He is also one of six managers–– along with Ancelotti, Mourinho, Giovanni Trapattoni, Tomislav Ivić, and Eric Gerets–– to have won top-flight domestic league championships in at least four countries.

Playing career

Club level
Happel started his professional playing career at Rapid Wien, where he made his first team debut at age 17. Forming a solid defensive partnership with Max Merkel, he played 14 years for Rapid, from 1943 until 1954 and 1956 until 1959, winning the Austrian Championship title six times. He was chosen in Rapid's Team of the Century in 1999.

The two years in between Happel played for Racing Club de Paris in France.

International level
Happel made his debut for Austria in September 1947 against Hungary. He played for Austria at the 1948 Summer Olympics. He was a participant at the 1954 FIFA World Cup in Switzerland, where he helped them reach third place, and also at the 1958 World Cup. His last international was a September 1958 match against Yugoslavia. He earned 51 caps and scored 5 goals.

Managerial career
After retiring as a player, Happel went on to become one of the greatest coaches of all time. He won the league title in four countries. He also took two clubs to gold in the European Champions' Cup (now the UEFA Champions League) and the Netherlands to second place in the 1978 World Cup. His first club was ADO Den Haag in 1962, with whom he won the Dutch Cup in 1968. After Den Haag he coached Feyenoord, with whom he won the European Cup (defeated Glasgow Celtic in the 1970 final) and the Intercontinental Cup in 1970, and the Dutch championship in 1971.

At the 1978 World Cup in Argentina, Happel was coach of The Netherlands national team and reached the final against the Argentina national team. Always a man of few words, Happel's pre-match pep talk is said to have consisted of just one sentence: "Gentlemen, two points." The Dutch, however, lost the final 3–1 in extra time.

During his career as coach, Happel worked for several clubs, including Sevilla, Club Brugge (winning the Belgian Championship title several times) and Hamburger SV (1981–1987, German champions in 1982 and 1983, German Cup winner 1987).

In 1983, he won the European Cup again, 13 years after the triumph with Feyenoord, this time with Hamburger SV, defeating Juventus in the final. He is one of five coaches in the history of the European Cup (now called Champions League) to win the title with two clubs, the others being Ottmar Hitzfeld, who won with Borussia Dortmund and Bayern Munich; José Mourinho, who won with Porto and Inter Milan; Jupp Heynckes, who won with Real Madrid and Bayern Munich; and Carlo Ancelotti, who won with Milan and Real Madrid.

In 1987, Happel returned to Austria as coach of Swarovski Tirol. With the club, he won the Austrian Championship title twice (1989 and 1990) before becoming coach of the Austria national team in 1992.

Personal life
All youth players of Rapid Vienna automatically became member of the Hitler Jugend in 1938. Ernst reported he refused to sing along to their songs until he was kicked out of their gatherings.

He was conscripted and dispatched to the Eastern Front in 1943. Although he never saw action, he was arrested by the Americans in 1945. He escaped by jumping out of the train wagon in Munich and took several months to make his way back to Vienna. He smuggled himself into the Soviet occupation zone with the excuse that he had seen from afar his house was still standing and that he'd started playing at Rapid Vienna again.

Ernst Happel never married. He was described by one of his ex-players Birger Jensen as a bit of a loner, always accompanied by his cigarettes and cognac. He nevertheless would meet up with Austrian friends, enjoying card games, pool and darts.

Death

A heavy smoker for most of his adult life, Happel died of lung cancer in 1992 at age 66. In the wake of his death, the biggest football stadium in Austria, the Praterstadion in Vienna, was renamed the Ernst-Happel-Stadion. Four days after his death, Austria played against Germany and reached a 0–0 draw; Happel's cap lay on the bench during the entire match.

Managerial statistics

Club

 *Dates of first and last games under Happel not dates of official appointments

National teams

 *Dates of first and last games under Happel not dates of official appointments

Honours

Player
Rapid Wien
 Austrian Football Bundesliga: 1945–46, 1947–48, 1950–51, 1951–52, 1953–54, 1956–57
 Austrian Cup: 1945–46
 Zentropa Cup: 1951

Austria
 FIFA World Cup third place: 1954

Manager
ADO Den Haag
 Dutch Cup: 1967–68

Feyenoord
 Eredivisie: 1970–71
 European Cup: 1969–70
 Intercontinental Cup: 1970

Club Brugge
 European Cup runners-up: 1977–78
 UEFA Cup runners-up: 1975–76
 Belgian Championship: 1975–76, 1976–77, 1977–78
 Belgian Cup: 1976–77

Standard Liège Belgian Cup: 1980–81Netherlands FIFA World Cup runners-up: 1978Hamburger SV European Cup: 1982–83
 UEFA Cup runners-up: 1981–82
 European Super Cup runners-up: 1983
 Bundesliga: 1981–82, 1982–83
 DFB-Pokal: 1986–87Swarovski Tirol'''
 Austrian Championship: 1988–89, 1989–90
 Austrian Cup: 1988–89

Individual
 European Coach of the Year—Sepp Herberger Award: 1978, 1983
 European Coach of the Season: 1982–83
 France Football 9th Greatest Manager of All Time: 2019
 World Soccer 9th Greatest Manager of All Time: 2013
 ESPN 14th Greatest Manager of All Time: 2013

References

External links

 Player profile – Rapid Archive
 

1925 births
1992 deaths
Austrian footballers
Austrian football managers
SK Rapid Wien players
Racing Club de France Football players
Ligue 1 players
Austrian Football Bundesliga players
Austria international footballers
Olympic footballers of Austria
Footballers at the 1948 Summer Olympics
1954 FIFA World Cup players
1958 FIFA World Cup players
ADO Den Haag managers
Feyenoord managers
Sevilla FC managers
Club Brugge KV head coaches
Netherlands national football team managers
Standard Liège managers
Hamburger SV managers
Austria national football team managers
1978 FIFA World Cup managers
Eredivisie managers
UEFA Champions League winning managers
Austrian expatriate footballers
Expatriate footballers in France
Austrian expatriate sportspeople in France
Austrian expatriate sportspeople in the Netherlands
Austrian expatriate sportspeople in Spain
Austrian expatriate sportspeople in Belgium
Austrian expatriate sportspeople in West Germany
Deaths from cancer in Austria
Footballers from Vienna
Bundesliga managers
Expatriate football managers in Belgium
Expatriate football managers in West Germany
Expatriate football managers in the Netherlands
Expatriate football managers in Spain
Deaths from lung cancer
Austrian expatriate football managers
FC Swarovski Tirol managers
United Soccer Association coaches
Association football defenders
K.R.C. Zuid-West-Vlaanderen managers
German Army personnel of World War II
German prisoners of war in World War II held by the United States
German escapees
Escapees from United States military detention